Kmer may refer to:

 Khmer people, mostly in Cambodia.
 KMER AM radio station in Kemmerer, Wyoming, USA.
 k-mer, all the possible substrings of length k that are contained in a string, typically considered for DNA sequences in computational genomics.